Radu Mîțu (born 4 November 1994) is a Moldovan footballer who plays as a goalkeeper for Swedish club Örebro SK.

Club career
After spending his entire career with Milsami Orhei, Mîțu signed for Swedish Division 1 club Vasalunds IF in March 2020. He left the club in December 2021, after suffering relegation from Superettan, making him a free agent.

On 17 April 2022, he signed a three-months contract with Örebro SK, remaining in Superettan.

References

External links

1994 births
Living people
People from Orhei
Moldovan footballers
Association football goalkeepers
Moldova under-21 international footballers
FC Milsami Orhei players
Vasalunds IF players
Örebro SK players
Moldovan Super Liga players
Ettan Fotboll players
Superettan players
Moldovan expatriate footballers
Expatriate footballers in Sweden
Moldovan expatriate sportspeople in Sweden